Thiemo de Bakker was the defending champion, but did not complete in the Juniors this year.

Donald Young defeated Uladzimir Ignatik in the final, 7–5, 6–1 to win the boys' singles tennis title at the 2007 Wimbledon Championships.

Seeds

  Uladzimir Ignatik (final)
  Matteo Trevisan (quarterfinals)
  Donald Young (champion)
  Fernando Romboli (first round)
  Jonathan Eysseric (third round)
  Greg Jones (semifinals)
  Stéphane Piro (first round)
  Kellen Damico (third round)
  Brydan Klein (quarterfinals)
  Martin Kližan (first round)
  Roman Jebavý (first round)
  John-Patrick Smith (second round)
  Stephen Donald (first round)
  Ricardo Urzúa-Rivera (third round)
  Thomas Fabbiano (third round)
  Guillermo Rivera-Aránguiz (first round)

Draw

Finals

Top half

Section 1

Section 2

Bottom half

Section 3

Section 4

References

External links

Boys' Singles
Wimbledon Championship by year – Boys' singles